The Royal Regiment of Artillery is an Arm of the British Army.  The Regiment is made up of two distinct arms; the Royal Horse Artillery and the Royal Artillery.  Somewhat confusingly both consist of a number of Regiments, which are comparable to Battalions in size. Each regiment is made up of a number of Batteries.

Current Batteries of the Royal Regiment of Artillery
The following list includes the Battery name, its battle honour title and the year the Battery was formed. It also includes its equipment or role, and current location.

Regular Batteries in Suspended Animation (By order of Seniority)

Units in Suspended Animation are not disbanded and remain on the Royal Regiment of Artillery's Order of Battle and maintain their order of precedence alongside Active Regular units.  Their property, histories etc. are stored and they may be brought out of Suspended Animation at a later stage, unlike disbanded units which cease to exist and cannot be reanimated.  The precedence of Regular batteries is by date of formation and was authorised by The Master Gunner in his decree of 1 November 1986.  Precedence is accorded to RHA Batteries (despite their younger age) by authority of Queens Regulations 1975 para 8.001.

Royal Horse Artillery
H Battery (Ramsay's Troop)
V Parachute Battery

Royal Artillery
15 (HQ) Battery
16 Battery (Sandham's Company)
17 (Corunna) Battery
104 Battery
105 Battery
106 Battery
107 Battery
108 Battery
109 Battery
110 Battery
111 (Dragon) Battery
113 Battery
124 Battery
126 Battery
128 Battery
137 (Java) Battery
145 (Maiwand) Battery
152 (Inkerman) Battery
156 (Inkerman) Battery
160 Battery (Middleton's Company)
171 (The Broken Wheel) Battery
2 Battery
224 Battery
25 Battery
26 Battery
27 (Strange's) Battery
33 Battery
35 Battery
37 Battery
38 (Seringapatam) Battery
39 Battery
40 Battery
41 Battery
42 (Alem Hamza) Battery
44 Battery
45 Battery
47 Battery
48 Battery
50 Battery
51 (Kabul 1842) Battery
52 (Niagara) Battery
54 (Maharajapore) Battery
56 (Olpherts) Battery
59 (Sphinx) Battery
60 Battery
67 Battery
69 Battery
68 Battery
70 Battery
72 Battery
75 Battery
76 (Maude's Company) Battery
77 Battery
78 Battery
79 (Kirkee) Battery
80 Battery
81 Battery
82 Battery
87 Battery
89 Battery
90 Battery
91 Battery
92 Battery
95 Battery
96 Battery
98 Battery
99 Battery
W Battery
Z Battery

TA/Reserve Batteries in Suspended Animation (By order of Seniority)

The Order of Precedence of Volunteer Batteries is by Battery number – only those from 1967 are shown.

200 (Sussex Yeomanry) Battery – converted in October 1992 to 127 (Sussex Yeomanry) Field Squadron in the Royal Engineers
201 (Hertfordshire and Bedfordshire Yeomanry) Battery – placed in S/A in 2014
202 (Suffolk and Norfolk Yeomanry) Battery – converted in 2006 to No. 677 (Suffolk and Norfolk Yeomanry) Squadron, Army Air Corps
209/213 (Manchester and St Helens) Battery – formed in 2001, under Army 2020 was broken up to form new 209 (Manchester) Battery in Manchester and Headquarters Troop in St Helens
 215 (North Down) Battery – formed in 1986, disbanded in 1993
 218 (Lothian) Battery – formed in 1986, disbanded in 1993 and lineage went to new HQ Battery
 219 (City of Dundee) Battery – formed in 1987, disbanded in 1993

TA/Reserve Troops 
Some former TA/Army Reserve batteries were reduced to troops (equivalent of a platoon).

Former Batteries

 213 (South Lancashire Artillery) Battery – amalgamated with 209 (Manchester and St Helens) Battery in 2001 to form 209/213 Bty, reformed in 2014 under Army 2020 as Headquarters Troop
218 (City of Edinburgh) Headquarters Battery  – formed in 1986 as Headquarters (City of Edinburgh) Battery, later 218 (City of Edinburgh) Headquarters Battery in 1993, reduced to Troop strength in 2006
 307 (South Nottinghamshire Hussars Yeomanry, Royal Horse Artillery) Battery – formed in 1970, placed in S/A in 2014, reformed in 2018 as C (South Nottinghamshire Hussars) Troop under 210 (Staffordshire) Battery
 Headquarters (Tynemouth Volunteer) Battery, 101st (Northumbrian) Regiment Royal Artillery – formed as HQ Battery, later '(Tynemouth Volunteer)' subtitle added in 1974, reduced to troop under Future Army Structure in 2004, lineage also continued to Hexham Troop in 204 (Tyneside Scottish) Battery
 Headquarters (King's) Battery, 103rd (Lancashire Artillery Volunteers) Regiment Royal Artillery – formed as HQ Battery, subtitle '(King's)' added in 1969 from Liverpool Rifles, reduced to HQ Troop under Future Army Structure in 2004, disbanded and subsequently reformed in 2014 under Army 2020, but lineage transferred to South Lancashire Artillery
Headquarters Battery, 105th Regiment – S/A on 31 Mar 1993, reduced to HQ Troop

Troops on Formation

 D (Monmouthshire) Troop – formed in 1967, disbanded in 1992
 E (Glamorgan Yeomanry) Troop – formed in 1967 in 211 (South Wales) Battery, later C (Glamorgan Yeomanry) Troop
 F (Brecknockshire and Monmouthshire) Troop – formed in 1967 in 211 (South Wales) Battery
 Catterick Troop, 205 (3rd Durham Volunteer Artillery) Battery – formed following Army 2020 Refine at Marne Barracks, Catterick Garrison
 Isle of Man Troop, 208 (3rd West Lancashire Artillery) Battery, formed in 2018

References

References

External links
Royal Artillery Regiments

 
 
batteries
Royal Artillery batteries